Valverde is a former freguesia ("civil parish") in Aguiar da Beira Municipality, Guarda District, Portugal. It was merged with Souto de Aguiar da Beira in 2013 to form the new freguesia Souto de Aguiar da Beira e Valverde.

Demography

Monuments 

Igreja matriz de Valverde 

Capela de Santo Antão 

Fonte romana de Valverde

References 

Former parishes of Aguiar da Beira